Manish Gupta is an Indian politician who was the Minister for Power in the Government of West Bengal. He was a Member of the West Bengal Legislative Assembly. In the 2011 Vidhan Sabha election of West Bengal he historically defeated his former boss- the then incumbent Chief Minister of West Bengal, Buddhadeb Bhattacharjee, who remained the MLA of this constituency for twenty-four years by a huge margin of 16684 votes. He served under Buddhadeb Bhattacharjee as the Chief Secretary of West Bengal before he retired as an IAS officer. He also worked as the Chief Secretary of West Bengal under Chief Minister Jyoti Basu - a time when Buddhadeb Bhattacharjee was the Deputy Chief Minister.

On 10 March 2017, Manish Gupta was elected unopposed to the Rajya Sabha, after the seat had fallen vacant after the resignation of Mithun Chakraborty.

External links
 Manish Gupta's Tribute to his Former Boss, Jyoti Basu
 Affidavits filed by Manish Gupta in 2011 Assembly Election of West Bengal

References

Living people
Trinamool Congress politicians from West Bengal
West Bengal politicians
Place of birth missing (living people)
State cabinet ministers of West Bengal
1942 births
Rajya Sabha members from West Bengal